Cinere–Serpong Toll Road is one of the toll roads which are part of the Jakarta Outer Ring Road 2 which will connect to connect with the Kunciran–Serpong Toll Road in the west and the Cinere–Jagorawi Toll Road in the east. This toll road that connects South Tangerang with Depok, crosses several areas, such as Jombang, Ciputat, Pamulang, Pondok Cabe and Cinere. The toll road will be managed by PT Cinere Serpong Jaya (CSJ), the majority of whose shares are owned by PT Jasa Marga.

History
The toll road project was initiated in 2006, but the construction of the project was halted and delayed due to land acquisition issue, which again restarted in September 2017 after being halted for approximately eight years. The toll road was previously expected to be operational in 2019,  however, the first section was inaugurated in 1 April 2021 along with Cengkareng–Batu Ceper–Kunciran Toll Road. While the second section is currently undergoing land acquisition phase which will be used to connect this toll road with Cinere–Jagorawi Toll  Road, this section is expected to be operational in 2023.

Sections
This toll road is divided into two sections:

Exits

See also

Trans-Java toll road

References

Buildings and structures in Jakarta
Toll roads in Indonesia
Transport in Jakarta
Transport in West Java